was a Japanese politician of the Democratic Party of Japan, a member of the House of Councillors in the Diet (national legislature).

A native of Ashiya, Hyōgo close to Osaka, he graduated from Shimizudani High school and Ritsumeikan University, and received a master's degree in sociology of the family from Michigan State University in the United States.　From school days, he continued volunteer activity. After graduation, he served a non-profit organization "ASHINAGA" in Japan, like a "Daddy Long Legs" (traffic-accident orphaned child scholarship association).

Yamamoto was elected to the House of Representatives for the first time in 1993 as a member of Morihiro Hosokawa's Japan New Party but lost the seat in 2000. In 2001, he was elected to the House of Councillors for the first time. He was the expert of the social welfare, and wrestled with many problems over the social security system such as the reform of a pension policy and the medical system, the foundation of "the nursing care insurance". The question number of times in his Diet was the top-class. There is little legislation introduced by a Diet member in the Japan ("Act of Parliament").　However, he performed much an "Act of Parliament".

On May 22, 2006, Yamamoto announced in a speech in the House of Councilors plenary session that he was infected with cancer. He made an effort for the early conclusion of "The Basic Law to Promote Anti-Cancer (Cancer Control Act) :ja:がん対策基本法".

On December 22, 2007, Yamamoto died of thymic carcinoma. His seat in the House of Councillors was taken over by Hisako Ōishi on December 28.

Bibliography 
 "", published by Daiichi Shorin, 1998.
 "", published by SUIYOSHA, 2006.
 "", published by Asahi Shimbun, 2008.

References

External links 
 Official website in Japanese
 ASHINAGA traffic-accident orphaned child scholarship association

1949 births
2007 deaths
Politicians from Hyōgo Prefecture
Ritsumeikan University alumni
Michigan State University alumni
Members of the House of Representatives (Japan)
Members of the House of Councillors (Japan)
Deaths from cancer in Japan
Japan New Party politicians
Democratic Party of Japan politicians